Saudi Arabia national under-23 football team (also known as Saudi Arabia Olympics football team) is the football team representing Saudi Arabia in Olympics, AFC U-23 Championship, GCC U-23 Championship and any other under-23 international football tournaments. The team is controlled by the Saudi Arabian Football Federation.

Results and fixtures

Legend

2022

Coaching staff

Players

Current squad
 The following 26 players were called up for the friendlies against Qatar and Kuwait.
 Match date: 19 – 29 March 2023
 Opposition:  &

Recent call-ups
The following players have previously been called up to the Saudi Arabia under-23 squad in the last 12 months and remain eligible.

INJ Player withdrew from the squad due to an injury
PRE Preliminary squad
SEN Player withdrew from the squad due to a call up to the senior team
SUS Player suspended

Previous squads

Olympic Games
1996 Summer Olympics squads
2020 Summer Olympics squads

AFC U-23 Asian Cup
2013 AFC U-22 Championship squads
2016 AFC U-23 Championship squads
2018 AFC U-23 Championship squads
2020 AFC U-23 Championship squads
2022 AFC U-23 Asian Cup squads

Asian Games
Football at the 2014 Asian Games squads
Football at the 2018 Asian Games squads

WAFF U-23 Championship
2015 WAFF U-23 Championship squads
2021 WAFF U-23 Championship squads
2022 WAFF U-23 Championship squads

Overage players in Olympic Games

Competitive record

Olympic Games

*Denotes draws include knockout matches decided on penalty kicks.

AFC U-23 Asian Cup

*Draws include knockout matches decided via penalty shoot-out.

Islamic Solidarity Games

Asian Games

*Denotes draws include knockout matches decided via penalty shoot-out.

Gulf Cup under-23

*Draws include knockout matches decided via penalty shoot-out. 
**Gold background colour indicates that the tournament was won.
***Red border colour indicates tournament was held on home soil.

WAFF U-23 Championship

***Red border colour indicates tournament was held on home soil.

See also
Sport in Saudi Arabia
Football in Saudi Arabia
Women's football in Saudi Arabia

Saudi Arabia national football team
Saudi Arabia national under-20 football team
Saudi Arabia national under-17 football team
Saudi Arabia women's national football team

References

External links

Official website 

Asian national under-23 association football teams
Under-23